, a Latin phrase meaning "the war of all against all", is the description that Thomas Hobbes gives to human existence in the state-of-nature thought experiment that he conducts in De Cive (1642) and Leviathan (1651). The common modern English usage is a war of "each against all" where war is rare and terms such as "competition" or "struggle" are more common.

Thomas Hobbes' use 
In Leviathan itself, Hobbes speaks of 'warre of every one against every one', of 'a war [...] of every man against every man' and of 'a perpetuall warre of every man against his neighbour', but the Latin phrase occurs in De Cive:

Later on, two slightly modified versions are presented in De Cive:

In chapter XIII of Leviathan, Hobbes explains the concept with these words:

The thought experiment places people in a pre-social condition, and theorizes what would happen in such a condition. According to Hobbes, the outcome is that people choose to enter a social contract, giving up some of their liberties in order to enjoy peace. This thought experiment is a test for the legitimation of a state in fulfilling its role as "sovereign" to guarantee social order, and for comparing different types of states on that basis.

Hobbes distinguishes between war and battle: war does not only consist of actual battle; it points to the situation in which one knows there is a 'Will to contend by Battle'.

Later uses 
In his Notes on the State of Virginia (1785), Thomas Jefferson uses the phrase  ("war of all things against all things", assuming  is intended to be neuter like ) as he laments that the constitution of that state was twice at risk of being sacrificed to the nomination of a dictator after the manner of the Roman Republic.

The phrase was sometimes used by Karl Marx and Friedrich Engels:
 In On the Jewish Question (1843–1844):

 In Outlines of the Critique of Political Economy (1857–1858):

The English translation eliminates the Latin phrase used in the original German.
 In a letter from Marx to Engels (18 June 1862):

 In a letter to Pyotr Lavrov (London, 12–17 November 1875), Engels is expressed clearly against any attempt to legitimize the trend anthropomorphizing human nature to the distorted view of natural selection:

It was also used by Friedrich Nietzsche in On Truth and Lies in a Nonmoral Sense (1873):

See also 

 Anomie
 Failed state
 Homo homini lupus
 List of Latin phrases
 Rat race
 Social contract theories
 State of nature

References 

1642 in military history
17th-century neologisms
Enlightenment philosophy
Latin philosophical phrases
Latin political words and phrases
Metaphors referring to war and violence
Concepts in ethics
Thomas Hobbes
Thought experiments in ethics